The Kickoff Classic was a season-opening college football game played at Giants Stadium in East Rutherford, New Jersey from 1983 to 2002.

History
In 1978, the New Jersey Sports and Exposition Authority (NJSEA), which operated and scheduled events at Giants Stadium, decided to host an end-of-season bowl game, called the Garden State Bowl. There were four such bowl games held, but attendance was lower than hoped by the NJSEA due to December weather and less attractive teams. Consequently, NJSEA decided to host a "bowl" game in the beginning of the season instead. This would attract more popular teams and ensure better attendance due to more favorable weather conditions.

The first contest, held on August 29, 1983, was the first regular-season college football game to be played in the month of August. The game featured the defending national champions Penn State Nittany Lions and the pre-season No. 1 ranked team, the Nebraska Cornhuskers. The game was not carried by any of the networks broadcasting college football at the time; instead, the rights to the game were sold into syndication by Michael Botwinik's Katz Communications, and the game aired on various local stations throughout the country. (One of these stations, Philadelphia's WKBS, signed off for good right after the game, making the inaugural Kickoff Classic the last program the station carried.)

Eventually there would be twenty Kickoff Classics, many of which were carried by ABC Sports nationally. Participation in the Kickoff Classic allowed teams to play a twelve-game regular season. Rule changes by the NCAA regarding season opening 'extra games' brought an end to the series in 2002, as well as similar games, such as the west coast-based Pigskin Classic and the midwest-based Eddie Robinson Classic.

In 2008, a new form of kickoff games were born. While not cut from the same mold, the Chick-fil-A Kickoff Game held its inaugural game in Atlanta, GA in an effort to direct the nation's attention to one site for the start of the college football season.

Game results

Rankings from AP Poll prior to game.

References 

American football in New Jersey
College football kickoff games
Sports in the New York metropolitan area
1983 establishments in New Jersey
2002 disestablishments in New Jersey
Recurring sporting events established in 1983
Recurring sporting events disestablished in 2002